Dan Schoen (born December 7, 1974) is an American politician and former member of the Minnesota Senate. A member of the Minnesota Democratic–Farmer–Labor Party (DFL), he represented District 54 in the southeastern Twin Cities metropolitan area. He is also a former member of the Minnesota House of Representatives, where he represented District 54A.

Early life, education, and career
Schoen graduated from MACCRAY High School in 1993. He attended St. John's University in Collegeville and Minneapolis Community and Technical College, where he graduated from the Paramedic program. He attended Ridgewater College in Willmar, Minnesota, graduating with an A.A. in Law Enforcement. He is a Police officer and Paramedic.

Minnesota Legislature
Schoen was first elected to the Minnesota House of Representatives in 2012 and was re-elected in 2014. After Katie Sieben announced she would not seek re-election to the Minnesota Senate, Schoen announced his intentions to run. He went on to win in the 2016 election. Schoen resigned from the Senate on December 15, 2017 following a sexual harassment scandal.

Sexual harassment allegations

On November 8, 2017, MinnPost published an online story in which three women, including state Rep. Erin Maye Quade, accused Schoen of sexually harassing them. In response, Schoen said that the allegations were false or taken out of context. Political leaders from both parties called for Schoen to resign, including Governor Mark Dayton, Democratic-Farmer-Labor Party Chairman Ken Martin, Senate Majority Leader Paul Gazelka, and Senate Minority Leader Tom Bakk.

On November 14, 2017, a Minnesota Senate staff member, Ellen Anderson, alleged that Schoen had sent her an unsolicited photo of male genitalia via Snapchat in 2015.

After initially denying the incidents, but concluding he could no longer serve his district effectively, Schoen resigned on December 15, 2017.

Personal life
Schoen has two children and resides in St. Paul Park, Minnesota.

References

External links

Official campaign website

1974 births
Living people
Democratic Party members of the Minnesota House of Representatives
Democratic Party Minnesota state senators
21st-century American politicians
Paramedics
American municipal police officers
People from Washington County, Minnesota